Yoldere (Laz language: Zurpici) is a village in the Hopa District, Artvin Province, Turkey. Its population is 441 (2021).

References

Villages in Hopa District